Magellan's Cross Pavilion is a stone kiosk in Cebu City, Philippines. The structure is situated on Plaza Sugbo beside the Basilica del Santo Niño It houses a Christian cross that was planted by explorers of the Spanish expedition of the first circumnavigation of the world, led by Ferdinand Magellan, upon arriving in Cebu in the Philippines on April 21, 1521.

Along with the Basilica del Santo Niño's church and convent buildings, the pavilion is a declared National Cultural Treasure of the Philippines.

Background

Pavilion

The Magellan's Cross Pavilion which houses the tindalo cross was built sometime in the 1800s. The structure is octagonal kiosk made of coral stone.

The pavilion and the tindalo cross itself sustained cracks due to the 2013 Bohol earthquake. The original cross was also found to have deteriorated due to termites in 2015. The pavilion was closed for renovations and was reopened in March 2016.

On the ceiling of the pavilion's interior, is a mural depicting the baptism of Rajah Humabon and his household by Fr. Pedro Valderrama and the planting of a wooden cross by Ferdinand Magellan. The artwork was done by Jess Roa and Serry M. Josol.

Cross
The Magellan's Cross could refer to the original wooden cross planted by explorers of the Spanish expedition of the first circumnavigation of the world, led by Ferdinand Magellan, upon arriving in Cebu in the Philippines on April 21, 1521.

The original cross was encased inside another wooden cross made of tindalo wood in 1835. This is to protect the original cross from people who chipped away parts of the cross who believe that the cross possesses miraculous powers. Some people, however, believe that the original cross has been destroyed.

The cross was named as the "2021 Jubilee Cross" as part of the 2021 Quincentennial Commemorations in the Philippines.

Designation
The pavilion along with the Basilica del Santo Niño Church and Convent were collectively declared as a National Cultural Treasure by the National Museum of the Philippines on April 14, 2021.

References 

Catholic Church in the Philippines
History of the Philippines (1565–1898)
Landmarks in the Philippines
Buildings and structures in Cebu City
Tourist attractions in Cebu City
Memorial crosses